British 2nd Division may refer to:

2nd Airborne Division (United Kingdom)
2nd Mounted Division 
3rd Mounted Division, known in its earliest incarnation as the 2/2nd Mounted Division
2nd Cavalry Division (United Kingdom)
2nd (African) Division
2nd Infantry Division (United Kingdom)
2nd Armoured Division (United Kingdom)

See also
2nd (Rawalpindi) Division, a British Indian Army before and during World War I
2nd Indian Cavalry Division, a British Indian Army during World War I
2nd Division (disambiguation)